Legislative elections were held in France on 9 July 1842. Only citizens paying taxes were eligible to vote.

Results

Aftermath
Louis-Philippe of France dissolved the legislature on 16 July 1846.

Sources 

Legislative elections in France
France
Legislative
France